Michael Joseph Edwards (born November 27, 2000) is an American professional soccer player who plays as a defender for Colorado Rapids.

Career
Born in Woodbridge, Virginia, Edwards began his career in the youth academy of D.C. United. In 2018, Edwards impressed some scouts during a Florida tournament and had trials at German clubs Freiburg and 1. FC Köln before joining VfL Wolfsburg. Edwards made his debut for VfL Wolfsburg II on August 10, 2019 against Hamburger SV II.

On March 4, 2021, Edwards returned to the United States and joined Major League Soccer club Colorado Rapids who acquired his rights from D.C. United. A few weeks later, on March 29, Edwards was loaned to the Colorado Springs Switchbacks. He made his professional debut for the club on May 1 against San Antonio FC, starting in the 3–0 defeat.

On November 10, 2022, his contract option was declined by Colorado. He re-signed with the club for their 2023 season.

Career statistics

References

External links
 Profile at Colorado Rapids

2000 births
Living people
Sportspeople from Virginia
American soccer players
Association football defenders
VfL Wolfsburg II players
Colorado Rapids players
Colorado Springs Switchbacks FC players
Regionalliga players
USL Championship players
Soccer players from Virginia
American expatriate soccer players
Expatriate footballers in Germany
Colorado Rapids 2 players
MLS Next Pro players